Banteay Ampil District is a district in Oddar Meanchey province in northern Cambodia. According to the 1998 census of Cambodia, it had a population of 27,075.

Administration 
The following table shows the villages of Banteay Ampil district by commune.

Demography 
The district is subdivided into 4 communes (khum) and 86 villages (phum).

References

Districts of Oddar Meanchey province